Out of the Past is a 1933 British crime film directed by Leslie S. Hiscott and starring Lester Matthews, Joan Marion and Jack Raine. It was made as a quota quickie at Teddington Studios.

Cast
 Lester Matthews as Captain Leslie Farebrother  
 Joan Marion as Frances Dane  
 Jack Raine as Eric Cotton 
 Henry Mollison as Gerald Brassard  
 Eric Stanley as Sir John Brassard  
 Margaret Damer as Lady Brassard  
 Aubrey Dexter as David Mannering  
 Wilfred Shine as Richard Travers

References

Bibliography
 Chibnall, Steve. Quota Quickies: The Birth of the British 'B' Film. British Film Institute, 2007.
 Low, Rachael. Filmmaking in 1930s Britain. George Allen & Unwin, 1985.
 Wood, Linda. British Films, 1927-1939. British Film Institute, 1986.

External links

1933 films
British crime films
1933 crime films
1930s English-language films
Films shot at Teddington Studios
Films directed by Leslie S. Hiscott
Quota quickies
Films set in England
British black-and-white films
1930s British films